Cramér's theorem is a fundamental result in the theory of large deviations, a subdiscipline of probability theory. It determines the rate function of a series of iid random variables.
A weak version of this result was first shown by Harald Cramér in 1938.

Statement 
The logarithmic moment generating function (which is the cumulant-generating function) of a random variable is defined as:

Let  be a sequence of iid real random variables with finite logarithmic moment generating function, e.g.  for all .

Then the Legendre transform of :

satisfies,

for all 

In the terminology of the theory of large deviations the result can be reformulated as follows:

If  is a series of iid random variables, then the distributions  satisfy a large deviation principle with rate function .

References 

Large deviations theory
Probability theorems